Afric Pepperbird is the second album by Norwegian saxophonist Jan Garbarek and his first released on the ECM label performed by Garbarek's quartet featuring Terje Rypdal, Arild Andersen and Jon Christensen.

The name of the album: Garbarek told Arild Andersen that Garbarek believes that he read about a bird in a book "or something", according to author Jan Omdahl; in a newspaper article, the author has given his emerging theory, about which "pepperbird" which likely was the inspiration for the title of the song and album.

Reception 
The Allmusic review by Brian Olewnick awards the album 4½ stars, and states, "Together with Sart, Tryptikon, and Witchi-Tai-To (as well as a prior recording on Flying Dutchman), this album represents the strongest, most aggressive portion of Garbarek's career, before he succumbed to what became known as the ECM aesthetic. Very highly recommended".

Track listing 
All compositions by Jan Garbarek, except where noted.

 "Skarabée" – 6:16
 "Mah-Jong" – (Andersen) 1:52
 "Beast of Kommodo" – 12:23
 "Blow Away Zone" – 8:37
 "MYB" – (Andersen) 1:50
 "Concentus" – (Andersen) 0:50
 "Afric Pepperbird" – 7:58
 "Blupp" – (Christensen) 1:05

Personnel 
 Jan Garbarek – tenor saxophone, bass saxophone, clarinet, flute, percussion
 Terje Rypdal – guitar, bugle
 Arild Andersen – bass, thumb piano, xylophone
 Jon Christensen – percussion

References 

Jan Garbarek albums
1971 albums
ECM Records albums
Albums produced by Manfred Eicher